Taşören can refer to:

 Taşören, Güdül
 Taşören, Kovancılar